Croydon Football Club is an English semi-professional football club based in Croydon, London. They play at Croydon Sports Arena in South Norwood. The club was founded in 1953 as Croydon Amateurs.

History
The club was founded in 1953 as Croydon Amateurs FC and its original players came from some of the stronger clubs playing in local football. The club was specially formed to play at the Croydon Arena (still its home today) when it was officially opened in 1953. The team made its debut at the Arena against Malden Town on Saturday 5 September 1953, winning 4-3. The club spent their first ten years in the Surrey Senior League but whilst failing to win the championship (thrice finishing runners-up), evolved into one of that competition's strongest teams. In 1963–64, they joined the Spartan League, winning the league title at the first attempt in their only season in the competition. 1964 saw them join the Athenian League where they spent the next ten years, winning the Second Division title in 1965–66, suffering relegation four years later and then gaining two successive promotions to the Premier Division as runners-up to Herne Bay (1970–71) and Harlow Town (1971–72) under the managership of Jimmy Rose. Rose's departure to Dulwich Hamlet saw a mass player exodus and a season of struggle ensued. 1973 saw the suffix Amateurs dropped due to the impending changes to the status of players and a year later, under the management of Ted Shepherd, election to the expanding Isthmian League.

Two seasons later, after an unbeaten 1975–76 campaign, the club gained promotion to the Isthmian's top division – initially titled Division One but then retitled the Premier Division where they spent twelve seasons before relegation to the First Division in 1989.  An FA Cup run in the 1979–80 season led to a home draw in the 2nd round to Football League opposition in the shape of Division Three Millwall. The tie was switched to be played at Selhurst Park and in front of almost 10,000 people the Croydon team, captained by Alec Jackson held their League opponents to a 1-1 draw thanks to a Rod Ward goal. The replay three days later could not separate the two sides after 90 minutes with Constable scoring twice for Croydon, but Millwall eventually winning the match narrowly 3-2 after extra time.  A further relegation followed in 1994, but following Ken Jarvie taking over as Chairman / Manager and internal reorganisation, they were promoted back to Division One within two seasons. The club's first Isthmian League title – champions of Division One followed in 2000, before relegation two years later.

The non-league scene was reorganised at the end of the 2005–06 season and this restructuring saw them placed in the Kent League where following a third-place finish in 2006–07, the club finished in mid-table the second two seasons. 2008–09 culminated with success in the Kent League Cup after a penalty shootout win over Erith Town.

That turned out to be the club's final Kent League fixture as they shuffled sideways into the Combined Counties League (a competition which evolved from the Surrey Senior League) for the 2009–10 season. This is effectively back where they spent their first ten years and there is long-term rebuilding underway - the first three seasons in the CCFL saw them finish lower midway.  For the 2014-15 season, the club was switched to the Southern Counties East League (formerly the Kent League).

The club also runs a successful youth programme,  a midweek Under 18 team playing in Ryman Youth League, a second under 18 team playing in the new Combined Counties league and a Sunday team who play in the Croydon Municipal league. In their first season the Sunday side were promoted and won the Leonard Vase Cup (2012–13)  Recent players to have graduated from the youth programme include Danny Mills, Lee Brown and Stefan Payne.

Nickname
The club's nickname "The Trams" was adopted around 2000 when the Tramlink system opened, running round the back of the ground, Arena being the closest stop less than two minutes walk from the turnstiles.

Supporters 

Croydon fans are collectively known as 'The Barmy Trams Army' and are referred to as the '12th man' by the club. They are known for their vocal support but friendly nature.

Ground

Croydon play at Croydon Sports Arena, Albert Road, South Norwood, SE25 4QL. The Croydon FC clubhouse overlooks Croydon Sports Arena and has a bar where supporters meet before and after games.

As of November 2020, the club have announced a temporary switch of home ground to the Crystal Palace National Sports Centre. It has a capacity of 15,500, but can be and has been in the past expanded to 24,000 with temporary seating.

Club honours
Isthmian League Division One Winners: 1999–2000
Isthmian League Division Two Runners-up: 1975–76 (undefeated) (retitled Division One 1977–78), 1995–96
Isthmian League Cup Finalists: 1974–75, 2000–01
Isthmian League Full Members Cup Winners: 1999-00
London Senior Cup Winners: 2001–02 – Finalists: 1978–79
Surrey Senior Cup Winners: 1981–82 – Finalists: 1976–77, 1999–00
Kent League Cup Winners: 2008–09

Kent League Challenge Shield Winners: 2009
Athenian League Division One Runners-up: 1971–72
Athenian League Division Two Winners: 1965–66 – Runners-up 1970–71
Spartan League Champions: 1963–64
Surrey Senior League Runners-up: 1956–57, 1960–61, 1962–63
Surrey Senior League Cup Winners 1960–61, 1962–63 – Finalists: 1953–54, 1959–60, 1961–62
Surrey Senior League Charity Cup Winners: 1962–63 – Finalists: 1957–58 Shared with Dorking: 1953–54

Club records
Record attendance:
At The Arena - May 1954 - 1600 - v Dorking - Surrey Senior League Charity Cup Final

– 1 November 1975 – 1450	v Wycombe Wanderers (FA Cup 4th Qualifying Round)
At Selhurst Park – 15 December 1979 – 9809 v Millwall (FA Cup Second Round)
Record Goalscorers –    Fred Morris (1959–64 – 159 goals), Tony Luckett (1962–73 – 125 goals), Peter McCluskey (1953–63 – 124 goals), Alec Jackson (1977–88 – 111 goals)
Most goals in one match –    Les Whitton (1982–83 – 5 goals v Crawley Town), Jeff Duah-Kessie (2016–17 – 5 goals v Erith & Belvedere)
Record Appearances – Alec Jackson (1977–88 – 441 plus 9 as sub), Tony Luckett (1962–73 – 409 plus 1 as sub)	
Record Win – 21 January 1961 home v Banstead Athletic 11–0 Surrey Senior League
Record Defeat – 19 March 1994 away v Staines Town 0–14 Isthmian League, 2 April 1994 away v Berkhamsted Town 1–14 Isthmian League
Best league position: 4th in Isthmian League, Premier Division (then level 6), 1985–86
Best FA Cup performance: 2nd round, 1979–80
Best FA Trophy performance: 2nd round, 1981–82, 1982–83, 2001–02
Best FA Vase performance: fourth round, 1994–95, 2008–09, 2016–17

Former players

References

External links
Official site
Twitter 
Instagram
Trams TV

 
Football clubs in England
Sport in the London Borough of Croydon
Association football clubs established in 1953
Football clubs in London
Isthmian League
Combined Counties Football League
Southern Counties East Football League
Athenian League
1953 establishments in England